Hikk Naal is a Punjabi film starring Amrinder Gill, sam sohi (making his acting debut), Mahie Gill, Rana Ranbir & Binnu Dhillon.

Music for the film will be given by Tru-Skool and shooting of the movie starts August onwards in Canada.

Cast
 Amrinder Gill as Amar
 sam sohi as Jagjit Nri
 Mahie Gill as Rani
 Rana Ranbir as Sehaj
 Rahul Dev as Gurmit
 Kaamjeet Anmol as Angad
 B.N. Sharma as Raj
 Binnu Dhillon as Kinder
 Inderpreet Ghag as Happy
 Arshdeep singh as Amli
 Harman aulakh as Bhuru

Soundtrack

References

 Hikk Naal Punjabi Movie  on FilmsPunjabi.Com

Punjabi-language Indian films
2010s Punjabi-language films
2017 films